On March 13, 2023, a pickup truck hit eleven pedestrians in Amqui, Quebec, Canada, killing three and injuring eight. A male driver attempted to flee the scene, but was arrested. Police described the incident as premeditated and deliberate.

Incident
At 3:00 p.m. EST on March 13, 2023 in Amqui, a town 350 kilometers (220 miles) northeast of Quebec City in the Bas-Saint-Laurent region of Quebec, Canada, a man drove his pick up truck into groups of pedestrians walking along St-Benoît Boulevard, also known as Route 132. Investigators suggest the driver swerved between sides of the road in order to hit victims who were chosen at random.

A witness said victims were spread over hundreds of metres. Eleven people were struck in the incident, including a baby and a toddler. Two elderly men, aged 65 and 73, were killed. A third victim, aged 41, later died. Three victims remain in the hospital under critical condition.

Aftermath 
Immediately after the incident, the victims were rushed to the Amqui Hospital and a  code orange was declared, indicating a high casualty incident. Five patients were transferred to other hospitals for specialized treatment, one to nearby Rimouski, four to Quebec City, and one to Montreal.

In the hours after the incident, the Sûreté du Québec (SQ) confirmed 2 dead and 9 injured, with three people facing life-threatening injuries.  They also announced that the incident was deliberate and that the driver acted alone. Senior government unofficially confirmed with the media that it was not a terrorist attack.

Premier François Legault offered his support to residents of Amqui after conversing with the town's mayor. Prime Minister Justin Trudeau also expressed his concern to the town, stating "My heart is with the people of Amqui, Quebec today. As we learn more about the tragic events that have taken place, I’m keeping everyone affected in my thoughts."

On March 15, the town reopened the road of the crash site and declared that the town hall would observe a period of mourning and fly flags at half mast and ring the Church bills at 3:05 pm, the time of the incident. Four patients remained in hospital, three in critical condition.

On March 17, Quebec Premier François Legault led a delegation of provincial party leaders to Amqui to walk along the street where people were struck by the truck and support the people of the town. He promised that his government would do more to fund mental health programs to prevent incidents like this in the spring 2023 budget.

Accused

Background
The driver was Steeve Gagnon, 38, who was from Amqui. In 2006, he pleaded guilty to drunk driving charges for a fine of $600. In August 2022, he quit his job of one year driving trucks for a transport company in Mont-Joli, Quebec to take medical leave. Neighbors and employer describe an isolated man with few friends. The accused was known to police, having sent them a letter within a few weeks of the attack. Friends who spoke with him in the weeks before the incident said he was experiencing "hard times" and suffered from poor mental health. In the weeks leading up to the incident, the accused posted increasingly incoherent videos involving conspiracy theories on TikTok, including one several hours before the attack.

Legal proceedings  
The accused turned himself in to the Sûreté du Québec (SQ) after fleeing the scene. Police arrested him for a hit and run causing death. He is facing two charges for dangerous driving causing death.

Gagnon entered no plea. His next court appearance is to be scheduled on April 5, 2023. He remains in police custody.

See also
 Laval daycare bus crash

References

2023 disasters in Canada
2023 in Quebec
2023 road incidents
2020s road incidents in North America
Disasters in Quebec
History of Bas-Saint-Laurent
March 2023 events in Canada
Vehicular rampage in Canada